Jorge Alejandro Rodríguez Hernández (born 3 September 2001) is a Mexican professional footballer who plays as a left-back for Liga MX club Toluca.

International career
Rodríguez was called up by Raúl Chabrand to participate with the under-21 team at the 2022 Maurice Revello Tournament, where Mexico finished the tournament in third place.

Career statistics

Club

References

External links
 
 
 

Living people
1996 births
Association football defenders
Mexican footballers
Mexico youth international footballers
Liga MX players
Deportivo Toluca F.C. players
Footballers from Jalisco
People from Tlaquepaque